The 1st Annual Streamy Awards was the first ever awards ceremony dedicated entirely to web series and the first installment of the Streamy Awards. The awards were held on March 28, 2009, at the Wadsworth Theatre in Los Angeles, California. The event had over 1,300 audience members in attendance and was simultaneously broadcast live online. The Official Red Carpet Pre-Show was hosted by Shira Lazar and the award show was co-hosted by Tubefilter, NewTeeVee and Tilzy.TV. The web series The Guild and Dr. Horrible's Sing-Along Blog were the biggest winners of the night, winning four and six awards, respectively, out of the 25 award categories. The show was met by positive reception by celebrities in attendance and the media.

Winners and nominees 

The nominees were announced on March 13, 2009 and the finalists for the Audience Choice Award for Best Web Series were announced on March 17. The Streamy Craft Award winners were announced in a ceremony held on March 26, 2009. The remaining award categories were announced during the main ceremony at the Wadsworth Theatre on March 28. Winners of the categories were selected by the International Academy of Web Television except for the Audience Choice Award for Best Web Series which was put to a public vote.

Winners are listed first, in bold.

Web series with multiple nominations and awards

Reception 
The New York Times Magazine columnist Virginia Heffernan called the show "a goofy and a powerful experience." Heffernan, alongside Alexia Tsotsis writing for LA Weekly, were impressed by the celebrity presence at the show, with Tsotsis calling it "an Emmys for Web TV." Maria Russo, writing for TheWrap, and Patrick Orndorff, writing for Wired, praised the quality of the nominees. Russo opined of the show that although "[in] the big scheme of things it all feels very fledgling", the existence of the awards felt "like a cool glimpse into the future". Heffernan, Tsotsis, and Jill Weinberger of Gigaom, singled out the speeches of Dr. Horrible's Sing-Along Blog writer Joss Whedon and The Guild star Felicia Day as particularly memorable with Whedon praising the online content creators in attendance and Day saying of her awards "this is for everyone who ever said no to me." YouTuber and singer Tay Zonday was enthusiastic about the awards saying that they show "that people don't have to play the system to have their art acknowledged," and actor David Faustino said of the show "we're at a baby stage of something that's going to be amazingly giant and I'm excited to be on ground floor." Brian Lowry writing for Variety called the Streamys the "Worst Award Name Ever".

See also 
List of Streamy Award winners

References

External links
Streamy Awards website

Streamy Awards
Streamy Awards
2009 in American television
2009 in Internet culture